Omphalotus flagelliformis is a bioluminescent fungus native to Yunnan Province in southwestern China. Fruitbodies are reddish-brown to brown, with convex, flattened, or funnel-shaped caps typically  in diameter. It was fruiting in a cluster around the base of a tree identified as being in the family Fagaceae. Molecular analysis suggests that Omphalotus flagelliformis is closely related to O. illudens and O. mexicanus. The specific epithet flagelliformis refers to the "flagelliform" (long, slender, and flexible) appendages of the cheilocystidia.

See also
List of bioluminescent fungi

References

External links

Bioluminescent fungi
flagelliformis
Poisonous fungi
Fungi described in 2013
Fungi of China